St. Mary's Catholic Church is a historic Catholic church building in an eastern neighborhood of Dayton, Ohio, United States.  Constructed at the beginning of the twentieth century, it remains home to an active parish.  Its grand architecture has made it an aviator's landmark, and it has been named a historic site by the federal government.

Parish history

Emanuel Church, the first Catholic parish in Dayton, was formed in 1837.  Many English-speaking families left to form a separate parish in 1846, but Emanuel continued growing to the point that division was necessary by the end of the 1850s.  Accordingly, land was chosen on Xenia Avenue at the Allen Street intersection in one of the city's eastern neighborhoods, and the owner donated enough property to permit the construction of a church, rectory, and school.  Archbishop Purcell of Cincinnati laid the cornerstone in April 1859, and the finished building was consecrated by Purcell and Henry Damian Juncker, the Bishop of Alton, in August of the following year.  The building measured , but by the opening years of the twentieth century, the parish had outgrown it, and construction began on a new building; Archbishop Moeller laid the cornerstone in July 1905 and consecrated it in November 1906.  Growth continued, and St. Anthony's Church was established in 1913 by families coming out of St. Mary's.

St. Mary's remains an active part of the Archdiocese of Cincinnati to the present day.  Masses are celebrated both in English and in Spanish.

Architecture

The current St. Mary's Church is a Romanesque Revival structure built in a mix of brick and stone.  Constructed according to a design by John B. Vermont, the design features two massive clock towers on the three-bay facade.  Three large doorways piece the facade at the top of a staircase, with occasional large windows and numerous pairs of narrower windows on higher levels.  Each window is topped with a dormered dome above the clock.  Built at a cost of $125,000 (or $ in 2013 dollars), the church is a landmark because of the twin towers; during World War II, Army aviators used it as a waypoint when navigating to the runways at Wright Field.

Preservation
In April 1983, St. Mary's Church was listed on the National Register of Historic Places.  Although as a religious property it would not normally be considered eligible for designation, it nevertheless qualified because of its distinctive historic architecture.  It is one of five Dayton churches on the Register, along with Sacred Heart, St. Adalbert's, and Holy Cross Catholic Churches and First Lutheran Church.

References

External links
Parish website
Video with numerous images of the church's interior

Roman Catholic churches completed in 1890
Roman Catholic churches in Dayton, Ohio
Clock towers in Ohio
National Register of Historic Places in Montgomery County, Ohio
Romanesque Revival church buildings in Ohio
Churches on the National Register of Historic Places in Ohio
19th-century Roman Catholic church buildings in the United States